The Douglas Point Nuclear Power Plant was proposed in 1973 for a site on the Potomac River to the south of Washington, D.C. by the Potomac Electric Power Company (PEPCO). The project was set aside in the late 1970s. Opposition centered on the plant's effects on striped bass spawning grounds in the Potomac and consequent damage to the striped bass fishery in the Chesapeake Bay.

The   site was purchased by the state of Maryland and the Bureau of Land Management and is operated as the  Douglas Point State National Resources Management Area, part of the Maryland Department of Natural Resources' Nanjemoy Wildlife Management Area.

References

External links
 Douglas Point Recreation Area at the Bureau of Land Management

Cancelled nuclear power stations in the United States
Nuclear power plants in Maryland
Charles County, Maryland